The Battle of Santa Inés was a Venezuelan battle which occurred between December 9 and 10, 1859, during the Federal War between the federal forces under General Ezequiel Zamora, and the conservative government of General Pedro Estanislao Ramos, with a victory for the former.

Background

Rebel Army 
Once the forces had been gathered in Guanare in mid-November 1859, Generals Juan Crisóstomo Falcón and Ezequiel Zamora moved to Barinas, followed by the Western Government Army, whose commander, General Pedro Estanislao Ramos, gave the order to chase and beat them. After this retreat movement, the federal army settled in Santa Inés, located about 36 km southwest of the city of Barinas, on the right bank of the Santo Domingo River. The federalist forces' regrouping was completed on December 9.

It was then that General Zamora took a defensive position and formulated a plan that consisted of a withdrawal, executed by the front line troops, to attract the attacker to an area where they would be destroyed by a counterattack. The front line troops, in addition to channeling the action of the attackers, needed to cause as much attrition as possible, by means of using the forces in three successive lines of trenches, having a fourth line which would be the final position and wherein the attacker would receive the maximum firepower and final blow, increased by the reserve forces from the preceding lines.

To comply with the above plan of attack, General Zamora made the following proposals: The advance trench was to be located in the village of La Palmas, and it was to be commanded by Colonels Jesús Hernández Hernández y León Hernández; a bit further back by a mill and a hut, the first line was to beorganized under General Ignacio Antonio Ortiz; the second line to be commanded by General Rafael Petit was about 900 meters back; the third line to be led by General Pedro Aranguren was formed at 800 meters beyond, at a crossroads; finally the fourth line, 800 meters from the crossroads, where the town was, was to be the reserve. According to the plan prepared by Zamora, upon presentation of the attacker in La Palma, the federalist troops would offer little resistance and redeploy to the first position; who would then be delivered to the attacker, after some resistance the defenders would occupy the second position; then they would redeploy to the third just as in the previous line. This would leave the attackers at the mercy of the coup de grace by the reserve. This was the first time that the tactic of digging defensive trenches was performed in Latin America.

Battle 
On December 8, the centralist army spent the night in the village of San Lorenzo, on the left bank of the Santo Domingo River. The next morning, the river level dropped and the centralist forces advanced towards La Palma, so federalist forces had to leave their position and go to the mill. Meanwhile, the armed camp in La Palma was attacked, and in the assault they lost about 1,800 men.

On December 10, the Conservatives resumed the attack, resuming contact with the defenders of the mill (first position), who retreated after causing heavy casualties to the attacker. After the action against the first position, the attackers continued on the next position (second), which was taken after a bloody battle. After that the aim of the centralists was to conquer the third position, the strongest of which had been taken. To this end, General Ramos insisted  in thorough combat with artillery support, but the position could not be taken. It was expected that there would be greater resistance before the attackers should fall under the action of forces in the village. Moreover, the attack carried out by Ramos, through an intricate entrenchment, efficiently combined with a barrage of fire, resulted in complete failure for the government forces, which had 900 losses . Convinced at last what was fruitlessness of his company, General Ramos decided to order a withdrawal, which took place on midnight of that day. Finally, on December 11 at dawn, noting the absence of the attackers, Zamora decided it was convenient to carry out the relics of the centralist army, and went in pursuit of the defeated

Consequences 
General Ramos was seriously injured, they had lost all their artillery and large number of horses, and ordered the withdrawal to Barinas, in which less than 2,000 troops came, being chased by rebels. The city was besieged on December 23. After that, Zamora left with 6,000 men from Barinas to Caracas, taking places on his way. The decisive event of the war would be the Battle of Coplé on February 17, 1860.

See also 
 Federal War

References 

Santa Ines
Federal War
1859 in Venezuela
Conflicts in 1859
December 1859 events